Charles R. Kocsis (January 27, 1913 – May 30, 2006) was an American amateur golfer.

Kocsis was introduced to the game as a caddie at the Phoenix Country Club, which is now Rogell Municipal Golf Course. One of fourteen children, he grew up in the Old Redford area of Detroit. Attended Redford High and was victorious at the city and state championship levels.

Kocsis was the winner of six Michigan Match Play Amateurs and six Michigan Medal Play Amateurs, three Michigan Opens (1931, 1945, 1946), individual intercollegiate champion member of three U.S. Walker Cup teams, member of two NCAA Championship teams at the University of Michigan, low amateur in the Masters, low amateur in two U.S. Opens, runner-up at the 1956 U.S. Amateur, and runner-up at the 1937 Western Amateur.

Kocsis also found success on the senior level winning the US National Open Senior Championship in 1969, 1970, and 1979.  Kocsis played in the International Seniors Championship five times and won four - 1970, 1973, 1980, and 1988.  He set the tournament record at Gleneagles in 1970 with a 13 under par total of 271.  During his time at the University of Michigan, Kocsis became a member of the  Lambda Chi Alpha Fraternity.

The Golf Association of Michigan voted Kocsis the Michigan amateur golfer of the century and was a member of the first class elected into the Michigan Golf Hall of Fame.

Tournament wins
this list may be incomplete
1930 Michigan Amateur
1931 Michigan Open
1933 Michigan Amateur
1934 Michigan Amateur
1936 NCAA Championship
1937 Michigan Amateur
1945 Michigan Open
1946 Michigan Open
1948 Michigan Amateur
1951 Michigan Amateur
1955 Michigan Amateur Medal Play
1958 Michigan Amateur Medal Play
1959 Michigan Amateur Medal Play
1960 Dogwood Invitational, Michigan Amateur Medal Play
1961 Michigan Amateur Medal Play
1962 Michigan Amateur Medal Play

Results in major championships

Note: Kocsis never played in The Open Championship nor the PGA Championship.

LA = low amateur
NYF = tournament not yet founded
NT = no tournament
CUT = missed the half-way cut
R128, R64, R32, R16, QF, SF = round in which player lost in match play
"T" indicates a tie for a place

Sources: U.S. Open and U.S. Amateur, 1938 Amateur Championship

U.S. national team appearances
Amateur
Walker Cup: 1938, 1949 (winners), 1957 (winners)

See also
 University of Michigan Athletic Hall of Honor
 Kupelian, Vartan. Forever Scratch:Chuck Kocsis-An Amateur for the Ages. Ann Arbor Media Group, 2007.

References

External links
Michigan Golf Hall of Fame profile
Obituary from the USGA

American male golfers
Amateur golfers
Michigan Wolverines men's golfers
Golfers from Michigan
1913 births
2006 deaths